Lord Wright may refer to:

 Lewis Wright, Baron Wright of Ashton-under-Lyne (1903–1974), a British politician and trade unionist
 Patrick Wright, Baron Wright of Richmond (born 1931), a British diplomat
 Robert Wright, Baron Wright (1869–1964), a British judge